Jennings is a surname of early medieval English origin (also the Anglicised version of the Irish surnames Mac Sheóinín or MacJonin). Notable people with the surname include:

Jennings (Swedish noble family)

A–G
Adam Jennings (born 1982), American football player
Al Jennings (1863–1961), American attorney in Oklahoma Territory, train robber and silent film star
Alex Jennings (born 1957), British actor
Andrew Jennings (1943–2022), British investigative journalist
Anfernee Jennings (born 1997), American football player
Asa Jennings (1877–1933), American who commanded the evacuation of refugees after the Great Fire of Smyrna
Bernard Jennings (1929–2017), British local historian and adult educationist
Billy Jennings (born 1952), English footballer
Billy Jennings (Welsh footballer) (1893–1968), Welsh footballer
Brandon Jennings (born 1989), American basketball player
Brent Jennings (born 1951), American actor
Brian Jennings, American football player
Bryant Jennings, American boxer
Charles Edward Jennings (1751–1799), Irish-born French general
Charles Jennings (journalist) (1908–1973), Canadian journalist
Christine Jennings (born 1945), American politician
Claudia Jennings (1949–1979), American model and actress
Clyde Jennings (1916–2006), Florida philatelist
Desmond Jennings (born 1986), American baseball player
Desmond Domnique Jennings (1971–1999), American serial killer
Edward Jennings (VC) (1820–1889), Irish recipient of the Victoria Cross
Edward H. Jennings (1937–2019), tenth president of Ohio State University
Ed Jennings (born 1968), Florida politician
Edward Jennings (rowing) (1898–1975), American coxswain
Elizabeth Jennings (1926–2001), English poet
Elizabeth Jennings Graham (1830–1901), American black civil rights activist and teacher
Ernie Jennings (born 1949), American football player
Francis Jennings, American historian
Garth Jennings (born 1972), English film director, screenwriter, producer, actor and writer
Gary Jennings (1928–1999), American author
Gary Jennings Jr. (born 1997), American football player
Gavin Jennings (born 1957), Victorian Politician 
George Jennings (1810–1882), pioneering British sanitary engineer
Gerald H. Jennings, ichthyologist and author
Grant Jennings, (born 1965), Canadian  ice hockey player
Greg Jennings, American football player

H–L
Henry Jennings, British privateer
Henry Constantine Jennings, English antiquarian
Herbert Spencer Jennings, zoologist, geneticist and eugenicist
Hilde Jennings (1906–?), German actress
Hughie Jennings, American baseball player
Humphrey Jennings (1907–1950), English filmmaker
Ivor Jennings (1903–1965), British lawyer
J. B. Jennings, American politician
James Jennings (disambiguation), several people
Jauan Jennings (born 1997), American football player
Jazz Jennings, American transgender activist  
Jeremy Jennings, English political theorist
Jesse D. Jennings (1909–1997), American archaeologist
Joanne Jennings (born 1969), British high jumper
John Jennings (disambiguation), several people
Jonas Jennings, American football player
Jonathan Jennings, first governor of Indiana
J. T. W. Jennings, 20th century architect
Kate Jennings (1948–2021), Australian writer
Keaton Jennings, English cricketer
Keith Jennings (American football) (born 1966), American football player
Keith Jennings (basketball) (born 1968), American basketball player and coach
Keith R. Jennings (born 1932), English chemist
Keith Jennings (cricketer) (born 1953), English cricketer
Ken Jennings, holder of longest winning streak on the game show Jeopardy!
Kenneth Jennings (disambiguation), several people
La Vinia Delois Jennings, American literary scholar
Leonard Jennings, English cricketer and Royal Air Force officer
Luke Jennings, British author of the novel Codename Villanelle
Lyfe Jennings, American musician
Lynn Jennings, American distance runner

M–Z
M. D. Jennings, American football player
Marlene Jennings, Canadian politician
Mason Jennings, American musician
Maureen Jennings (born 1939), British Canadian writer 
Maxine Jennings (born 1908/1909), American actress
Michael Jennings (disambiguation), several people
Morley Jennings (1890–1985), American college sports coach
Newell Jennings (1883–1965), Associate Justice of the Connecticut Supreme Court
Nicky Jennings (1946–2016), English footballer 
Nick Jennings (computer scientist) (born 1966), English Regius Professor of computer science
Nicolette Jennings (born 1996), American model, beauty pageant titleholder (Miss Florida USA 2019 and Top 10 finalist Miss USA 2019) 
Owen Jennings, New Zealand politician
Pat Jennings, Northern Irish footballer
Patrick Jennings (1831–1897), Australian politician
Paul Jennings (Australian author) (born 1943), Australian children's author
Paul Jennings (British author) (1918–1989), English humorist
Paul Jennings (slave) (1799–1874), American slave owned by President James Madison
Peter Jennings (1938–2005), ABC News anchor and newsman
Peter Jennings (serjeant-at-arms) (born 1934), British public servant
Peter R. Jennings (born 1950), Canadian scientist and entrepreneur
Philip Jennings (The Americans), fictional character in the 2010s American television drama series The Americans
Philip Jennings (Queenborough MP) (c1679–1740), English lawyer and politician, MP for Queenborough 1715–22
Sir Philip Jennings-Clerke, 1st Baronet (c1722–January 1788), known as Philip Jennings until the 1760s, MP for Totnes 1768–88
Renz L. Jennings (1899–1983), Associate Justice of the Arizona Supreme Court
Richard E. Jennings (1927–1991), British comic book artist 
Richard Jennings (c1619–1668), British politician
Rick Jennings (born 1953), American football player
Robert Yewdall Jennings (1913–2004), English jurist
Sarah Jennings (1660–1744), 1st Duchess of Marlborough
Shooter Jennings (born 1979), American musician
Stanford Jennings, American football player
Steve Jennings (footballer) (born 1984), English footballer
Stephen Arthur Jennings, Canadian mathematician
Talbot Jennings (1894–1985), American playwright and screenwriter 
Ted Jennings (born 1990), American football player
Theodore Jennings (1942–2020), American author
Tim Jennings (born 1983), American football player
Tom Jennings (born 1955), creator of FidoNet
Toni Jennings (born 1949), American politician
Waylon Jennings (1937–2002), American country music singer
Will Jennings (born 1944), American songwriter
William Dale Jennings, American author
William M. Jennings (1920–1981), American businessman and hockey team owner
William Nicholson Jennings (1860–1946), American photographer
W. Pat Jennings (1919–1994), U.S. Representative from Virginia
William Sherman Jennings (1863–1920), governor of Florida

See also
Justice Jennings (disambiguation)
 William Jennings Bryan

English-language surnames
Surnames of English origin
Anglicised Irish-language surnames
Patronymic surnames